N73 may refer to:
 N73 (Long Island bus)
 BMW N73, an automobile engine
 Escadrille N73, a unit of the French Air Force
 London Buses route N73
 N73 road (Ireland)
 Nokia N73, a mobile phone
 Red Lion Airport, in Burlington County, New Jersey, United States
 Rembarrnga language